The Roman Catholic Diocese of Damongo is a diocese located in the city of Damongo in the Ecclesiastical province of Tamale in Ghana.

History
 February 3, 1995: Established as Diocese of Damongo from the Metropolitan Archdiocese of Tamale

Special churches
The Cathedral is St. Anne's Cathedral in Damongo.

Leadership
 Bishops of Damongo (Roman rite)
 Bishop Philip Naameh (February 3, 1995 - 2011), appointed Archbishop of Tamale
 Bishop Peter Paul Angkyier (since 2011)

See also
Roman Catholicism in Ghana

Sources
 GCatholic.org
 Catholic Hierarchy
 Diocese of Damongo 

Damongo
Damongo
Christian organizations established in 1995
Roman Catholic dioceses and prelatures established in the 20th century
Roman Catholic Ecclesiastical Province of Tamale